A multrum is a large composting vessel, predominantly meant to decompose toilet excreta but also other organic residue. It is originally a composite word consisting of "multna" which means moldering or composting in Swedish and "rum" which is the Swedish word for room. A multrum has over several decades become a noun and has come to mean any large composting chamber connected to a toilet. This should not be confused with Clivus multrum which is a proprietary product.  In Scandinavia there are many kinds of composting toilet multrums like Mullis,  CompostEra besides Clivus Multrum.

Composting